Al-Ajʿud is a sub-district located in the At-Ta'iziyah District, Taiz Governorate, Yemen. Al-Ajʿud had a population of 4,536 according to the 2004 census.

References  

Sub-districts in At-Ta'iziyah District